Storm Castle, el.  is a mountain peak in the Gallatin Range in Gallatin County, Montana. The peak is located in the Gallatin National Forest. Storm Castle is also known as Castle Peak or Castle Mountain.  The peak is a popular  round trip hike from the Storm Castle trailhead in the Gallatin Canyon.

Gallery

See also
 Mountains in Gallatin County, Montana

References 

Mountains of Gallatin County, Montana
Mountains of Montana